Iassus lanio is the type species of planthoppers in its genus and the tribe Iassini.  This species can be found throughout Europe including the British Isles through to Russia and Northern Africa; no subspecies are listed in the Catalogue of Life.

References

External links
 
 

Hemiptera of Europe
Iassinae